Page Two – Sings a Collection of Her Most Famous Songs is a Patti Page LP album, issued by Mercury Records as catalog number MG-20096 in 1957.

This was the second album in a series of four, titled "Page 1" to "Page 4".

Reception 
Billboard welcomed the album saying: “Page 2,” second in Mercury’s new Patti Page LP series, features memorable tunes from the late 1920s and early 1930s—“It All Depends on You,” “My Ideal,” “Rockin’ Chair,” etc—sung with warmth, taste and sincerity by the thrush. Perfect programming for romantic jock segs.

Track listing

References

Patti Page albums
1957 compilation albums
Mercury Records compilation albums